Novoanninsky is a town and the administrative center of Novoanninsky District in Volgograd Oblast, Russia, located on the Buzuluk River (Don's basin),  northwest of Volgograd, the administrative center of the oblast. Population:

History
It was granted town status in 1956.

Administrative and municipal status
Within the framework of administrative divisions, Novoanninsky serves as the administrative center of Novoanninsky District. As an administrative division, it is, together with the settlement of uchkhoza Novoanninskogo selkhoztekhnikuma, incorporated within Novoanninsky District as the town of district significance of Novoanninsky. As a municipal division, the town of district significance of Novoanninsky is incorporated within Novoanninsky Municipal District as Novoanninsky Urban Settlement.

Transportation
The railway station in Novoannensky is called Filonovo.

References

Notes

Sources

Cities and towns in Volgograd Oblast